Symphyotrichum plumosum (formerly Aster plumosus) is a species of flowering plant in the family Asteraceae endemic to Florida in the United States. Its flowers have rose-purple ray florets and yellow turning to purple disk florets. It is of conservation concern.

Gallery

Citations

References

plumosum
Endemic flora of Florida
Flora of Florida
Plants described in 1924
Taxa named by John Kunkel Small